"Just Another Heartache" is a song recorded by American country music artist Chely Wright.  It was released in November 1997 as the second single from the album Let Me In.  The song reached #39 on the Billboard Hot Country Singles & Tracks chart.  The song was written by Ed Hill and Mark D. Sanders.

Chart performance

References

1997 singles
1997 songs
Chely Wright songs
Songs written by Ed Hill
Songs written by Mark D. Sanders
Song recordings produced by Tony Brown (record producer)
MCA Nashville Records singles